Jefferson County is one of the 36 counties in the U.S. state of Oregon. At the 2020 census, the population was 24,502. The county seat is Madras. The county is named after Mount Jefferson.

History
Jefferson County was created on December 12, 1914, from a portion of Crook County. The county owes much of its agricultural prosperity to the railroad, which links Madras with the Columbia River, and was completed in 1911, and to the development of irrigation projects in the late 1930s. The railroad was completed despite constant feuds and battles between two lines working on opposite sides of the Deschutes River.

Madras was incorporated in 1911, and has been the permanent county seat since a general election in 1916. The first (temporary) county seat was Culver, which was selected by a three-man commission appointed by the governor. Due to repeated tie votes over several days (with one vote each cast for Culver, Metolius and Madras). The deadlock was eventually broken by allowing the Metolius Commissioner to post the tie-breaker, by voting for Culver.

Rapid development in adjacent Deschutes County during the 1990s had farmers in Jefferson County concerned that they might be priced out of their own farmlands, which could be replaced by destination resorts, golf courses and other amenities for recent arrivals.

Geography

Adjacent counties
 Marion County (northwest)
 Wasco County (north)
 Wheeler County (east)
 Crook County (south)
 Deschutes County (south)
 Linn County (west)

National protected areas
 Crooked River National Grassland
 Deschutes National Forest (part)
 Mount Hood National Forest (part)
 Willamette National Forest (part)

Demographics

2000 census
At the 2000 census, there were 19,009 people, 6,727 households and 5,166 families living in the county. The racial make-up was 68.98% White, 0.26% Black or African American, 15.68% Native American, 0.30% Asian, 0.22% Pacific Islander, 11.32% from other races, and 3.23% from two or more races. 17.74% of the population were Hispanic or Latino of any race. 13.6% were of German, 9.5% English, 8.7% American and 5.3% Irish ancestry. 82.2% spoke English, 15.5% Spanish and 1.0% Sahaptian as their first language.

There were 6,727 households, of which 35.60% had children under the age of 18 living with them, 60.50% were married couples living together, 10.50% had a female householder with no husband present, and 23.20% were non-families. 18.60% of all households were made up of individuals, and 6.90% had someone living alone who was 65 years of age or older. The average household size was 2.80 and the average family size was 3.16.

29.80% of the population were under the age of 18, 7.70% from 18 to 24, 26.90% from 25 to 44, 23.20% from 45 to 64, and 12.40% who were 65 years of age or older. The median age was 35 years. For every 100 females there were 101.90 males. For every 100 females age 18 and over, there were 100.80 males.

The median household income was $35,853 and the median family income was $39,151. Males had a median income of $31,126 and females $22,086s. The per capita income was $15,675. About 10.40% of families and 14.60% of the population were below the poverty line, including 22.20% of those under age 18 and 5.90% of those age 65 or over.

2010 census
At the 2010 census, there were 21,720 people, 7,790 households and 5,646 families living in the county. The racial make-up was 69.0% white, 16.9% American Indian, 0.6% black or African American, 0.4% Asian, 0.1% Pacific islander, 9.1% from other races, and 3.8% from two or more races. Those of Hispanic or Latino origin made up 19.3% of the population. In terms of ancestry, 15.0% were German, 9.4% were Irish, 8.3% were English, and 4.9% were American.

Of the 7,790 households, 34.0% had children under the age of 18 living with them, 53.6% were married couples living together, 12.6% had a female householder with no husband present, 27.5% were non-families, and 22.2% of all households were made up of individuals. The average household size was 2.68 and the average family size was 3.11. The median age was 39.6 years.

The median household income was $41,425 and the median family income was $48,818. Males had a median income of $37,370 and females $30,047. The per capita income was $20,009. About 13.5% of families and 20.1% of the population were below the poverty line, including 33.6% of those under age 18 and 6.5% of those age 65 or over.

Communities

Cities
Culver
Madras (county seat)
Metolius

Census-designated places
Camp Sherman

 Crooked River Ranch

Warm Springs

Unincorporated communities

Ashwood
Kilts
Gateway
Geneva
Grandview
Grizzly
Horse Heaven
Opal City
Willowdale

Politics

Though Jefferson County is located in central Oregon, politically it falls in line with the eastern side of the state. The majority of registered voters who are part of a political party in Jefferson County, as well as most counties in eastern Oregon, are members of the Republican Party. No Democrat has won the majority of the votes in Jefferson County since Lyndon B. Johnson in 1964; the last Democrat to carry the county in a presidential election was Bill Clinton in 1992. In the 2008 presidential election, 51.47% of Jefferson County voters voted for Republican John McCain, while 43.05% voted for Democrat Barack Obama and 5.46% of voters either voted for a Third Party candidate or wrote in a candidate. These numbers show a small shift towards the Democratic candidate as well as a Third Party candidate when compared to the 2004 presidential election, in which 58.7% of Jefferson Country voters voted for George W. Bush, while 40% voted for John Kerry, and 1.3% of voters either voted for a Third Party candidate or wrote in a candidate.

Economy
Jefferson County also has vast rangelands and until 2016 had an industrial base related to forest products. The Warm Springs Forest Products Industry, a multimillion-dollar complex owned by the Confederated Tribes of Warm Springs — partially located in the northwestern corner of the county — was the single biggest industry. With 300 days of sunshine and a low yearly rainfall, fishing, hunting, camping, boating, water-skiing and rock hunting are major tourist activities.

The major landowners in the county are the Forest Service, which manages National Forest System Lands the comprise 24% of the lands within the county boundaries, and the Confederated Tribes of Warm Springs-Warm Springs Reservation, which owns and manages 21% of the lands within the county boundaries.

See also
 Confederated Tribes of Warm Springs
 Warm Springs Reservation, Oregon
 National Register of Historic Places listings in Jefferson County, Oregon

References

 
1914 establishments in Oregon
Populated places established in 1914